Las Ánimas is a volcano of the Central Ranges of the Colombian Andes at the border of the departments of Cauca and Nariño.

As are the neighbouring Petacas, the volcano is part of the Doña Juana Volcanic Complex, and lies northeast of the main volcano and southeast of the Petacas. The products of the volcanic activity of the volcano have been found in San Pablo, Nariño. The activity of the volcano has been noted as prehistoric.

The volcanoes are located between the El Tablón Fault to the west and the San Jerónimo Fault to the east.

See also 
 List of volcanoes in Colombia
 List of volcanoes by elevation

References

Bibliography

Maps 
 

Mountains of Colombia
Volcanoes of Colombia
Andean Volcanic Belt
Geography of Cauca Department
Geography of Nariño Department
Four-thousanders of the Andes